Elphinstone may refer to:

Places
Australia
 Elphinstone, Queensland (Isaac Region)
 Elphinstone, Queensland (Toowoomba Region)
 Elphinstone, Victoria
 County of Elphinstone, Queensland
 Lake Elphinstone, Queensland

Canada
 Elphinstone, Manitoba
 Mount Elphinstone Provincial Park, British Columbia

Egypt
 Elphinstone Reef, Red Sea

India
 Prabhadevi railway station known as Elphinstone Road until July 2017, Mumbai, India

United Kingdom
 Elphinstone, East Lothian, Scotland
 Port Elphinstone, Inverurie, Scotland

Groups and titles
 Clan Elphinstone
 Lord Elphinstone, a title in the Peerage of Scotland
 Elphinstone baronets

Schools 
 Elphinstone College, college of the University of Mumbai
 Elphinstone Hall, part of King's College, Aberdeen, Scotland
 Elphinstone High School, Mumbai, India

Other uses
 Elphinstone (surname)
 Elphinstone Bioscope, an early Indian film company
 Elphinstone Place, a cancelled building project in Glasgow, Scotland
 HMS Elphinstone, ships
 Elphinstone Engineering, an Australian manufacturer of transport equipment and truck weighing systems, based in Triabunna, Tasmania
 Elphinstone Group, an Australian manufacturer of  mining equipment, based in Burnie, Tasmania